Cody James Stamann (born November 9, 1989) is an American mixed martial artist currently competing in the Featherweight division of the Ultimate Fighting Championship.

Background
Stamann was born in Grand Rapids, Michigan and attended Grand Valley State University, where he competed in wrestling. Stamann also began boxing in high school at the age of 16. When MMA was introduced to Michigan, he was encouraged by his mother to transition to train MMA as a way to keep him out of trouble in life.

Mixed martial arts career

Early career
Stamann amassed an amateur record of 19–1 with seven titles before turning professional in 2010. After compiling a professional record of 14–1, fighting mostly in the Midwest region of United States for Knockout Promotions, Michiana Fight League, Triple X Cagefighting and Hoosier Fight Club, prior to joining the UFC, as well as Warrior Xtreme Cagefighting (WXC), Michigans oldest and largest MMA league.

Ultimate Fighting Championship
In his UFC debut, Stamann faced Terrion Ware on July 8, 2017, at UFC 213 in Las Vegas. He won the fight by unanimous decision.

Stamann faced Tom Duquesnoy at UFC 216 on October 7, 2017. He won the fight by split decision. After watching the fight, Stamann commented that Daniel Cormier and Joe Rogan were biased on his fight commentary, where the commentators mentioned Duquesnoy more in the first two rounds even though Stamann felt he was beating Duquesnoy.

Stamann faced Bryan Caraway on March 4, 2018, at  UFC 222. He won the fight by split decision.

Stamann faced Aljamain Sterling on September 8, 2018, at UFC 228. He lost the fight via submission in the second round.

Stamann faced Alejandro Pérez on March 2, 2019, at UFC 235. He won the fight by unanimous decision.

Stamann was expected to face Rob Font on June 22, 2019, at UFC on ESPN+ 12. However, on June 5, 2019, it was reported that Stamman had pulled out of the event due to injury and he was replaced by John Lineker.

After the fight with Font didn't materialize, Stamann relocated to Las Vegas and started training at Xtreme Couture.

Stamann faced Song Yadong on December 7, 2019, at UFC on ESPN 7. After three round fight, the fight ended with a majority draw.

Stamann was expected to face Raoni Barcelos on March 28, 2020, at UFC on ESPN: Ngannou vs. Rozenstruik. Due to the COVID-19 pandemic, the event was eventually postponed. Instead, Stamann faced Brian Kelleher on June 6, 2020, at UFC 250 in a featherweight bout. He won the bout via unanimous decision. 

Stamann faced Jimmie Rivera in a featherweight bout on July 16, 2020, at UFC on ESPN: Kattar vs. Ige. He lost the fight via unanimous decision.

Stamann was expected to face Merab Dvalishvili on December 5, 2020, at UFC on ESPN 19. However, on October 22, it was announced that Stamann had pulled out due to undisclosed reasons. The bout between Dvalishvili and Stamann was rescheduled for UFC Fight Night 184 on February 6, 2021. In turn, in mid January, Dvalishvili was forced to pull out from the bout due to the struggle of the after-effects of a COVID-19 complication, and he was replaced by Andre Ewell. After a positive test for COVID, Ewell was pulled from the event and replaced with UFC newcomer Askar Askarov, with the contest expected to take place at featherweight. On the day of the event, Askar was not medically cleared and the bout was cancelled. The bout between Dvalishvili and Stamann was re-scheduled again to May 1, 2021, at UFC on ESPN: Reyes vs. Procházka. Stamann lost the bout via unanimous decision.

Stamann faced Said Nurmagomedov on January 22, 2022, at UFC 270. Stamann lost the fight via submission in the first round.

Stamann faced Eddie Wineland on June 18, 2022, at UFC on ESPN 37. He won the fight via TKO less than a minute into round one. This win earned him the Performance of the Night award.

Stamann faced Luan Luiz Lacerda on January 21, 2023, at UFC 283. He won the fight via unanimous decision.

Stamann is scheduled to face  Douglas Silva de Andrade on May 13, 2023 at UFC Fight Night 224.

Championships and accomplishments
Ultimate Fighting Championship 
 Performance of the Night (One time)

Personal life
Stamann has two monikers. His moniker "Spartan" was coined after the name of his hometown, and "Mr. Wonderful" was given by his coach.

Stamann worked part-time in his family business prior to his first win in UFC.

Stamann enjoys fishing.

On May 27, 2020, it was reported that Stamann's 18-year-old brother Jacob had passed away.

Mixed martial arts record 

|-
|Win
|align=center|21–5–1
|Luan Lacerda
|Decision (unanimous)
|UFC 283
|
|align=center|3
|align=center|5:00
|Rio de Janeiro, Brazil
|
|-
|Win
|align=center|20–5–1
|Eddie Wineland
|TKO (punches)
|UFC on ESPN: Kattar vs. Emmett
|
|align=center|1
|align=center|0:59
|Austin, Texas, United States
|
|-
|Loss
|align=center|19–5–1
|Said Nurmagomedov
|Submission (guillotine choke)
|UFC 270
|
|align=center|1
|align=center|0:47
|Anaheim, California, United States
|
|-
|Loss
|align=center|19–4–1
|Merab Dvalishvili
|Decision (unanimous)
|UFC on ESPN: Reyes vs. Procházka
|
|align=center|3
|align=center|5:00
|Las Vegas, Nevada, United States
|
|-
|Loss
|align=center|19–3–1
|Jimmie Rivera
|Decision (unanimous)
|UFC on ESPN: Kattar vs. Ige 
|
|align=center|3
|align=center|5:00
|Abu Dhabi, United Arab Emirates
|
|-
|Win
|align=center|19–2–1
|Brian Kelleher
|Decision (unanimous)
|UFC 250
|
|align=center|3
|align=center|5:00
|Las Vegas, Nevada, United States
|
|-
|Draw
|align=center|
|Song Yadong
|Draw (majority)
|UFC on ESPN: Overeem vs. Rozenstruik 
|
|align=center|3
|align=center|5:00
|Washington, D.C., United States
|
|-
|Win
|align=center|18–2
|Alejandro Pérez
|Decision (unanimous)
|UFC 235 
|
|align=center|3
|align=center|5:00
|Las Vegas, Nevada, United States
|
|-
|Loss
|align=center|17–2
|Aljamain Sterling
|Submission (Suloev stretch)
|UFC 228 
|
|align=center|2
|align=center|3:42
|Dallas, Texas, United States
|
|- 
|Win
|align=center|17–1
|Bryan Caraway
|Decision (split)
|UFC 222 
|
|align=center|3
|align=center|5:00
|Las Vegas, Nevada, United States
|
|-
|Win
|align=center|16–1
|Tom Duquesnoy
|Decision (split)
|UFC 216 
|
|align=center|3
|align=center|5:00
|Las Vegas, Nevada, United States
|
|-
|Win
|align=center|15–1
|Terrion Ware
|Decision (unanimous)
|UFC 213 
|
|align=center|3
|align=center|5:00
|Las Vegas, Nevada, United States
|
|-
|Win
|align=center|14–1
|Zac Church
|TKO (punches)
|Knockout Promotions 55
|
|align=center|2
|align=center|2:38
|Grand Rapids, Michigan, United States
|
|-
|Win
|align=center|13–1
|Bill Kamery
|TKO (punches)
|Knockout Promotions 54
|
|align=center|1
|align=center|4:59
|Grand Rapids, Michigan, United States
|
|-
|Win
|align=center|12–1
|Stephen Cervantes
|Decision (majority)
|Knockout Promotions 51
|
|align=center|3
|align=center|5:00
|Grand Rapids, Michigan, United States
|
|-
|Win
|align=center|11–1
|Erik Vo
|Submission (kimura)
|Knockout Promotions 50
|
|align=center|3
|align=center|1:22
|Grand Rapids, Michigan, United States
|
|-
|Win
|align=center|10–1
|Farkhad Sharipov
|Decision (unanimous)
|Knockout Promotions 48 
|
|align=center|3
|align=center|5:00
|Grand Rapids, Michigan, United States
|
|-
|Win
|align=center|9–1
|Chris Dunn
|Decision (unanimous)
|Michiana Fight League 39
|
|align=center|5
|align=center|5:00
|South Bend, Indiana, United States
|
|-
|Win
|align=center|8–1
|Giovanni Moljo
|Decision (unanimous)
|Total Warrior Combat 26
|
|align=center|3
|align=center|5:00
|Lansing, Michigan, United States
|
|-
|Loss
|align=center|7–1
|Lawrence DiGiulio
|Decision (split)
|WXC 52
|
|align=center|3
|align=center|5:00
|Southgate, Michigan, United States
|
|-
|Win
|align=center|7–0
|Ruben Baraiac
|TKO (punches)
|Triple X Cagefighting: Legends 4
|
|align=center|3
|align=center|2:40
|Mt. Clemens, Michigan, United States
|
|-
|Win
|align=center|6–0
|Jeremy Czarnecki
|Decision (unanimous)
|Triple X Cagefighting: Legends 3
|
|align=center|5
|align=center|5:00
|Mt. Clemens, Michigan, United States
|
|-
|Win
|align=center|5–0
|Adam Alvarez
|TKO (punches)
|Triple X Cagefighting: Legends 2
|
|align=center|1
|align=center|1:40
|Mt. Clemens, Michigan, United States
|
|-
|Win
|align=center|4–0
|Terry House Jr.
|Decision (unanimous)
|Hoosier Fight Club 16
|
|align=center|3
|align=center|5:00
|Valparaiso, Indiana, United States
|
|-
|Win
|align=center|3–0
|Benjamin Alexandercu
|KO (punch)
|Local Kombat: New Beginnings
|
|align=center|2
|align=center|3:48
|Craiova, Romania
|
|-
|Win
|align=center|2–0
|Chris Bourdon
|Submission (guillotine choke)
|Impact Fight League 51
|
|align=center|1
|align=center|0:08
|Auburn Hills, Michigan, United States
|
|-
|Win
|align=center|1–0
|Chad Coon
|TKO (punches)
|Impact Fight League 39
|
|align=center|1
|align=center|3:49
|Auburn Hills, Michigan, United States
|

Professional boxing record

See also
 List of current UFC fighters
 List of male mixed martial artists

References

External links
 
 

1989 births
Living people
American practitioners of Brazilian jiu-jitsu
American male mixed martial artists
Featherweight mixed martial artists
Mixed martial artists utilizing collegiate wrestling
Mixed martial artists utilizing boxing
Mixed martial artists utilizing Brazilian jiu-jitsu
Sportspeople from Grand Rapids, Michigan
Grand Valley State University alumni
Ultimate Fighting Championship male fighters
SUPERKOMBAT mixed martial artists
American male boxers
American male sport wrestlers
Amateur wrestlers